Mario and the Magician is a 1994 German-language drama film directed by Klaus Maria Brandauer, based on the  1929  novella of the same name by Thomas Mann. It was entered into the 19th Moscow International Film Festival where Lajos Koltai won the Special Silver St. George for the Director of Photography.

Cast
 Julian Sands as Professor Fuhrmann
 Anna Galiena as Rachel Fuhrmann
 Jan Wachtel as Stephan Fuhrmann
 Nina Schweser as Sophie Fuhrmann
 Klaus Maria Brandauer as Cipolla
 Pavel Greco as Mario
 Valentina Chico as Silvestra
 Elisabeth Trissenaar as Sofronia Angiolieri
 Rolf Hoppe as Prefecto Angiolieri
 Philippe Leroy as Graziano (as Philippe Leroy Beaulieu)
 Ivano Marescotti as Pastore

References

External links
 

1994 films
1994 drama films
Austrian drama films
French drama films
German drama films
1990s German-language films
Films based on German novels
Films based on works by Thomas Mann
Films set in Italy
Films set in the 1920s
Films about vacationing
1990s German films
1990s French films